Wedding Cha Shinema is a 2019 Indian Marathi language comedy drama film directed by Milind Lele and written by Saleel Kulkarni. Produced by Saleel Kulkarni, the film stars Mukta Barve as Urvi, an aspiring filmmaker, who wants to make films on serious topics. The film has Shivaji Satam, Bhalchandra Kadam, Shivraj Waichal, Rucha Inamdar, Pravin Tarde, Alka Kubal, Sunil Barve, Ashwini Kalsekar, Sankarshan Karhade, Prajakta Hanamgar, Yogini Pofale, Pranit Kulkarni, Tyagraj Khadilkar and Adesh Aawre.

Produced by Gerua Productions and PESB, and distributed by Everest Entertainment the film was released on 12 April 2019. The film score and soundtrack album are composed by Saleel Kulkarni and cinematography by Abhijit Abde and the editing is done by Abhijit Deshpande.

Plot
A young Mumbai girl, Urvi (Mukta Barve) aspiring to be a filmmaker and looking to make it big, is unexpectedly allocated the job of directing pre-wedding and wedding festivities in a small village, in Western Maharashtra.
The story goes through the fun and cheerful pre-wedding shoot before the couple "much in love" realizes the compromises and adjustments that would come with the marriage What follows is confusion and chaos sprinkled with emotional highs and lows, in the midst of wedding preparations. All the characters in the movie are simple sincere and have no animosity. 
A light-hearted family comedy, depicting how people living in metropolitan and big cities view interpersonal relationships in comparison with those in smaller towns, yet the fundamental values and feelings of concern, compromise, affection stay universal.

Cast
Shivraj Waichal as Prakash Shahane (Balu)
Rucha Inamdar as Dr. Pari Pradhan
Mukta Barve as Urvi
Purnima Ahire as Manjari
Adesh Aware as Dhagya
Sunil Barve as Dr. Sameer Pradhan
Prajakta Hanamghar as Kaplana (Kalpi)
Bhalchandra Kadam as Madan
Ashwini Kalsekar as Dr. Anagha Pradhan
Sankarshan Karhade as Dilip Shahane
Tyagraj Khadilkar as Jumbo (Jamubwanth Joshi)
Alka Kubalas Prakash's Mother
Pranit Kulkarni as Kalpana 's Husband
Tushar Pandit as Mulicha Mama
Yogini Pophale as Surekha Shahane
Shivaji Satam as Appa Shahane
Shreyas Talpade as Abhi
Pravin Tarde as Mak (Makrandh)

Soundtrack

The soundtrack and background score were composed by Saleel Kulkarni, with lyrics penned by Anup Pawar, Saleel Kulkarni and Sandeep Khare. The soundtrack has in total 6 songs released by Everest Entertainment Pvt. Ltd. on 11 February 2019 and produced by Gerua Productions and PESB. Saurabh Shirsath, Swaroopa Barve, Amita Ghugari, Saleel Kulkarni, Aditya Athalye, Adarsh Shinde, Vaishali Mhade, Shubhankar Kulkarni, Prasenjeet Kosambi, Aarya Ambekar, Saleel Kulkarni and Avdhoot Gupte have sung in the film.

References

External links

2010s Marathi-language films